United States Capitol shooting incident can refer to three different events:
 1954 United States Capitol shooting
 1998 United States Capitol shooting
 Shooting of Ashli Babbitt

See also
 Shooting of Miriam Carey
 Congressional baseball shooting